White Sabers Drum & Bugle Corps is an all-age competitive drum and bugle corps based in Gates, NY. Founded in 1928, the corps has a long history as a parade corps. White Sabers is a two-time DCA Class A World Champion (2013, 2014), a perennial DCA Open Class finalist - achieving 4th place in 2019. The Corps began competing in DCA's new World Class in 2022.

The corps was formerly known as the American Legion New York Post #87 Drum and Bugle Corps.

About 
The Corps was founded in 1928 by the commander of the American Legion Post #87 in Dansville, New York (later renamed Daniel Goho, Inc. New York Post #87). In 1957, the corps gained independence from the American Legion post, and continued to perform as a concert and parade corps under the name Dansville White Sabers.

The corps competed at the Red Carpet Association Championship in 1977. Sometime later the corps became inactive.

After "fourteen years" of inactivity, an alumni reunion in 1994 revived interest in a Dansville-based corps. In 2004, the corps became active again, but did not compete.

In 2005, the White Sabers joined DCA as a Class A corps, and placed sixth against ten other competitors. The corps was a Class A finalist in 2006 and 2012, and Class A champions in 2013 and 2014. Kevin Gamin described the corps' 2014 performance as "strong enough to have made Open Class finals." White Sabers advanced to Open Class in 2015, and were finalists every year they were a part of Open Class. 2015 Executive Director Leslie Amico was awarded Open Class "Director of the Year."

In 2022, the Corps officially relocated from Dansville, NY to the Rochester suburb of Gates, NY. Also in 2022, DCA reclassified their competitive structure with the addition of a World Class—the White Sabers elected to compete in World Class, joining the Bushwackers, Reading Buccaneers, and Hawthorne Caballeros. Corps Director Ben Chaffee was awarded World Class "Director of the Year" in 2022.

Show Summary (2004–present) 
Source:

Gold indicates DCA Championship; blue background indicates DCA class finalist.

References

External links 
 
 

Drum Corps Associates corps
Small Drum Corps Association corps
1928 establishments in New York (state)
Musical groups established in 1928